John Holland (born August 18, 1952 in Sacramento, California) is an American retired slalom canoeist who competed from the late 1960s to the late 1970s. He finished 19th in the K-1 event at the 1972 Summer Olympics in Munich.

References
Sports-reference.com profile

1952 births
American male canoeists
Canoeists at the 1972 Summer Olympics
Living people
Olympic canoeists of the United States
Sportspeople from Sacramento, California